Fauna Productions is an Australian film and TV production company established by Lee Robinson, Lionel ('Bob') Austin and John McCallum who met during the making of the film They're a Weird Mob (1966). Robinson, Austin and McCallum wanted to make productions aimed at the international audience and enjoyed great success with the TV series Skippy the Bush Kangaroo  and Barrier Reef.

Fauna Productions is still in business, now being run by two sons of the founders, Philip Austin and Nick McCallum.

Select Credits
Skippy the Bush Kangaroo (1966–69) - TV series
The Intruders (1969) - film
Nickel Queen (1971) - film
Barrier Reef (1971–72) - TV series
Boney (1972–73) - TV series
Shannon's Mob (1975–76) - TV series
Bailey's Bird (1977) - TV series
Attack Force Z (1981) - film
The Highest Honor (1983) - film

References

External links
Company website

Film production companies of Australia